Hendersonina is a genus of land snails with an operculum, terrestrial gastropod mollusks in the family Pomatiidae.

Species 
Species within the genus Hendersonina include:
 Hendersonina bermudezi Torre & Bartsch, 1938
 Hendersonina canaliculata (Gundlach in Pfeiffer, 1863)
 Hendersonina cirrata (Wright in Pfeiffer, 1867)
 Hendersonina deceptor (Arango, 1882)
 Hendersonina discolorans (Wright in Pfeiffer, 1863)
 Hendersonina echinulata (Wright in Pfeiffer, 1863)
 Hendersonina hamlini (Arango, 1882)
 Hendersonina hendersoni (Torre, 1909)
 Hendersonina maculata Torre & Bartsch, 1938
 Hendersonina mendax (Torre & Bartsch, 1938)
 Hendersonina scobina (Gundlach in Pfeiffer, 1863)
 Hendersonina sinuosa (Wright in Pfeiffer, 1862)

References 

Pomatiidae